Hinson Wong Chun Hin (born 21 March 1999) is a Hong Kong professional footballer who is currently a free agent.

Club career

Rangers
On 10 September 2020, Rangers' Director of Football Philip Lee declared that Wong would join the club.

He left Rangers in 2022.

Honours

Club
Yuen Long
Senior Shield: 2017–18

References

External links

HKFA

Hong Kong footballers
Hong Kong Premier League players
Association football defenders
Association football midfielders
Yuen Long FC players
Dreams Sports Club players
Hong Kong Rangers FC players
1999 births
Living people